Statistics of North American Soccer League in season 1982. This was the 15th season of the NASL.

Overview
The league comprised 14 teams. The New York Cosmos won the championship. The NASL no longer used the 35-yard line for offside, but retained its presence for use in tie-breaker shootouts.

Changes from the previous season

New teams
None

Teams folding

Atlanta Chiefs
Calgary Boomers
California Surf
Dallas Tornado

Los Angeles Aztecs
Minnesota Kicks
Washington Diplomats

Atlanta, Calgary, California, Dallas and Washington folded in September 1981, while Los Angeles and Minnesota folded in November–December 1981.

Teams moving
None

Name changes
None

Regular season
W = Wins, L = Losses, GF = Goals For, GA = Goals Against, PT= point system

6 points for a win in regulation and overtime, 4 point for a shootout win,
0 points for a loss,
1 bonus point for each regulation goal scored, up to three per game.
 Premiers (most points).  Other playoff teams.

NASL All-Stars

Playoffs

Bracket

Quarterfinals

† Higher seed hosts Games 1 and 3

* Montreal Manic hosted Game 1 (instead of Game 2) due to stadium conflicts with the Expos baseball club.

Semifinals

† Higher seed hosts Games 1 and 3

Soccer Bowl '82

1982 NASL Champions: New York Cosmos

Post season awards
Most Valuable Player: Peter Ward, Seattle
Coach of the year: Johnny Giles, Vancouver
Rookie of the year: Pedro DeBrito, Tampa Bay
 North American Player of the Year:  Mark Peterson, Seattle
 Soccer Bowl MVP:  Giorgio Chinaglia, New York

References

External links
 Video of 1982 NASL goals of the year
 Complete Results and Standings

 
North American Soccer League (1968–1984) seasons
1982 in American soccer leagues
1982 in Canadian soccer